Getúlio may refer to:
 Getulio Agostini (1943-1990), Venezuelan botanist
 Getulio Alviani (1939-2018), Italian painter
 Getúlio Côrtes (born 1938), Brazilian singer
 Getúlio (footballer, 1947-2008), Getúlio Pedro da Cruz, Brazilian football goalkeeper
 Getúlio (footballer, born 1954), Getúlio Costa de Oliveira, Brazilian football right-back
 Getulio Delphim (born 1938), Brazilian comic artist
 Getúlio Fredo (born 1954), Brazilian football manager
 Getúlio Júnior (born 1983), Brazilian footballer
 Getulio Napeñas (born 1959), Filipino politician
 Getúlio Pedro da Cruz (1947-2008), Brazilian footballer
 Getulio Vaca (born 1984), Bolivian footballer
 Getúlio Vargas (1882-1954), President of Brazil
 Getúlio (footballer, born 1997), Getúlio Wandelly Silva Timoteo, Brazilian football forward

Places
 Getúlio Vargas, Rio Grande do Sul, Brazilian municipality
 Presidente Getúlio, Brazilian municipality

Others
 Fundação Getulio Vargas, Brazilian think tank
 Getúlio (film), 2014 film about Vargas
 Sergeant Getulio, 1983 Brazilian drama film

Portuguese masculine given names